Corosha District is one of twelve districts of the province Bongará in Peru.

References

External links
Corosha district official website 

1946 establishments in Peru
States and territories established in 1946
Districts of the Bongará Province
Districts of the Amazonas Region